"Let Me Roll It" is a song by the British–American rock band Paul McCartney and Wings, released on their 1973 album Band on the Run. The song was also released as the B-side to "Jet" in early 1974, and has remained a staple of McCartney's live concerts since it was first released.

Origin
The song's title was inspired by a quote from George Harrison's "I'd Have You Anytime," the opening track from his critically acclaimed All Things Must Pass. According to Ultimate Classic Rock contributor Nick DeRiso, Lennon incorporated the riff from "Let Me Roll It" into his 1974 song "Beef Jerky."  DeRiso rated it as Wings' 7th greatest song.

Alternatively, Rolling Stones critic Jon Landau, saw the song as a pastiche of John Lennon's sound, particularly the riff and the use of tape echo on the vocals. McCartney, however, didn't intend the song to be a pastiche of Lennon. He did say the vocal "does sound like John. ... I hadn't realised I'd sung it like John."

The song has sometimes been described as an answer or response to Lennon's song "How Do You Sleep?", a stinging attack on McCartney on the 1971 Imagine album. However, Philip Norman's authorized biography Paul McCartney: The Life, recounts that in 1972 — after the release of Imagine and before the release of Band on the Run — McCartney and Lennon met and "agreed that slagging one another off, on albums or through the music press, was stupid and childish." Norman quotes Lennon as saying that Band on the Run was "a great album."

Live performances
"Let Me Roll It" was performed regularly by Wings' during their Over the World tour. McCartney performed the song again during his New World Tour, and it has been a part of every tour since. He has also included live versions of the song on several live albums, including Wings over America, Paul Is Live, Back in the U.S. (and Back in the World), and Good Evening New York City.

Personnel
According to author Bruce Spizer:

Paul McCartney – lead vocals, guitar, bass guitar, drums
Linda McCartney – backing vocals, organ
Denny Laine – backing vocals, guitar

References

Citations

Sources

External links 
 Review of Let Me Roll It at The Beatles Bible

Paul McCartney songs
Paul McCartney and Wings songs
Songs written by Paul McCartney
Songs written by Linda McCartney
Song recordings produced by Paul McCartney
1974 songs
1974 singles
Apple Records singles
Music published by MPL Music Publishing